Superior Donuts is an American sitcom television series based on the play of the same name by Tracy Letts that aired on CBS from February 2, 2017, to May 14, 2018. It was produced by Daily Productions, Goldman-Donovan Productions and Teitelbaum Artists, in association with CBS Television Studios. Neil Goldman and Garrett Donovan served as showrunners.

On March 23, 2017, CBS renewed the series for a second season which premiered on October 30, 2017. On November 27, 2017, CBS ordered an additional eight episodes for the second season, bringing the total to 21 episodes. On May 12, 2018, CBS cancelled the series after two seasons and 34 episodes due to low ratings.

Synopsis
The series revolves around the relationship between donut shop owner Arthur Przybyszewski (Judd Hirsch), his new young employee, Franco Wicks (Jermaine Fowler), and the shop's various patrons in Chicago's Uptown neighborhood. With the donut shop struggling financially, Franco makes suggestions for improvement and modernization to the sometimes reluctant Arthur. Superior Donuts' supportive regulars include loyal patron Randy (Katey Sagal), a cop whose late father was Arthur's best friend; in season one only, her over-eager rookie partner, James (Darien Sills-Evans); Tush (David Koechner), a colorful customer who uses the shop counter as a makeshift office where he keeps tabs on a variety of odd jobs via fax machine; in season one only, Maya (Anna Baryshnikov), a privileged grad-school student working on her Ph. D; and Sweatpants (Rell Battle), Franco's longtime friend who's willing to dress as a donut to help drum up more business. Looking to cash in on the urban renewal is Arthur's over-caffeinated neighbor, aspiring real estate capitalist Fawz (Maz Jobrani), who pushes Arthur on a daily basis to sell the building to him. Season two introduces Sofia (Diane Guerrero), a food truck owner whom Franco befriends quickly.

Cast

Main
Judd Hirsch as Arthur Przybyszewski, the 75-year-old owner of the donut shop which he founded, with his now-deceased wife, in 1969. Arthur is an old-fashioned and sometimes grumpy widower.
Jermaine Fowler as Franco Wicks, the 28-year-old aspiring artist and Arthur's new and energetic but naive employee, who sees him as a mentor and friend and vows to help Arthur with his struggling donut shop. He and his father had visited Superior Donuts and bought a box of donuts regularly when he was younger.
Katey Sagal as Officer Randy DeLuca, a police officer, daughter of Arthur's best friend, and James' partner. In season 2, she gets promoted after passing the detective exam.
David Koechner as Carl 'Tush' Tushinski, a laid-off factory worker who now works odd jobs to make a living and uses Arthur's donut shop as his 'office'. He is one of Superior Donuts' loyal customers, though the episode "Wage Against the Machine" reveals he has run up a tab.
Maz Jobrani as Fawz Hamadani Farooq Al-Shahrani, a wealthy Iraqi real estate developer and Franco and Sweatpants' landlord. He owns the dry cleaners next door and wants to buy Superior Donuts and tear it down, despite the fact that he always gets coffee there. In addition to the dry cleaners and apartment buildings, Fawz owns "Rub-A-Dub Sub" and one-eighth of a Quizno's.
Rell Battle as Sweatpants, Franco's roommate and friend who helps Arthur drum up business.
Anna Baryshnikov as Maya (season 1), a college graduate student from an upper-class family who is frequently doing school work in the shop. She has a crush on Franco. The season 1 finale reveals that Maya was studying the donut shop employees and patrons for her doctoral dissertation. She doesn't appear after season 1.
Darien Sills-Evans as Officer James Jordan (season 1), Randy's geeky younger partner. In the season 2 premiere, it was revealed that he transferred to another police station.
Diane Guerrero as Sofia (season 2), a young Colombian-American gentrifier who parks her food truck that serves healthy, socially conscious breakfast foods in front of the donut shop. She grew up and attended college in Wisconsin. Franco develops a crush on her. The episode "Friends Without Benefits" reveals she reciprocates those feelings.

Guest

Production

Developed and filming 
The pilot was originally developed for the 2015–16 television season, but was not picked up, and was put in redevelopment by CBS. In May 2016, a new pilot was ordered, for consideration at midseason. On September 21, 2016, CBS ordered the pilot to series. On December 15, 2016, it was announced that the series would premiere as a "special preview" on February 2, 2017, following The Big Bang Theory and premiered for its regular Monday at 9:00 p.m. timeslot on February 6, 2017.

Casting 
On February 10, 2016, Crashing actor Jermaine Fowler joined the cast as Franco Wicks, a buddy/employee for Arthur, in the pilot. On August 1, 2016, Taxi star Judd Hirsch was cast as Arthur. Katey Sagal from Married... with Children and Sons of Anarchy was cast as a female lead for the pilot on September 8, 2016. In September 2016, it was announced that Anna Baryshnikov was cast as Maya; she was upgraded to a series regular role on October 6, 2016. On August 25, 2017, it was announced that Diane Guerrero would play Sofia in a regular role, to replace Baryshnikov.

Cancellation 
On May 12, 2018, it was announced that CBS officially cancelled Superior Donuts, along with Kevin Can Wait, 9JKL, Living Biblically, and Me, Myself & I. The combination of factors, including declining ratings, CBS's desire to have an ownership stake, and the network needing to clear space for three new sitcoms in the fall 2018 schedule, led to the show's demise.

Episodes

Season 1 (2017)

Season 2 (2017–18)
{{Episode table
|background = #72BBE6
|overall     = 5
|season      = 5
|title       = 21
|director    = 14
|writer      = 26
|airdate     = 14
|prodcode    = 6
|viewers     = 9
|prodcodeT   = code
|country     = U.S.
|episodes    = 

{{Episode list
 |EpisodeNumber= 29
 |EpisodeNumber2 = 16
 |Title= Friends Without Benefits
 |DirectedBy= Betsy Thomas
 |WrittenBy= Chuck Tatham
 |OriginalAirDate= 
 |ProdCode=216
 |Viewers= 4.64<ref>{{cite web|url=http://tvbythenumbers.zap2it.com/daily-ratings/monday-final-ratings-march-26-2018/|archive-url=https://web.archive.org/web/20180328010844/http://tvbythenumbers.zap2it.com/daily-ratings/monday-final-ratings-march-26-2018/|url-status=dead|archive-date=March 28, 2018|title=American Idol' and 'The Good Doctor' adjust up, 'Good Girls' adjusts down: Monday final ratings|last=Porter|first=Rick|date=March 27, 2018|work=TV by the Numbers|access-date=March 27, 2018}}</ref>
 |ShortSummary= As Franco prepares to take the next step with Tavi and go on a trip with her, she becomes upset when Franco goes to Sofia for relationship advice. Franco insists he and Sofia are just friends, but Tavi says the way they communicate indicates there may be something stronger. Just when Sofia realizes she has feelings for Franco, he tells her that he and Tavi patched up their issues. Meanwhile, Fawz plays undercover boss to try and find out who is stealing cheese from one of his sub shops.
 |LineColor= 72BBE6
}}

}}

 Home media 
The first season of Superior Donuts was released on DVD on January 22, 2018. The second season was released on June 9, 2020.

Reception
Critical response
Review aggregator Rotten Tomatoes gives the series an approval rating of 62% based on 21 reviews, with an average rating of 5.7/10. The site's critical consensus reads, "While Superior Donuts'' talented cast impressively delivers, the annoying laugh track and stale jokes leave a hole in the middle of a crusty — albeit topical — narrative." On Metacritic the series has a weighted average score of 56 out of 100, based on 22 critics, indicating "mixed or average reviews".

Ratings

References

External links

2010s American sitcoms
2010s American workplace comedy television series
2017 American television series debuts
2018 American television series endings
CBS original programming
English-language television shows
Television series based on plays
Television series by CBS Studios
Television shows set in Chicago
Television series set in restaurants
Fictional portrayals of the Chicago Police Department